The Consulate-General of Russia in San Francisco was a diplomatic mission in the 2790 Green Street building in Pacific Heights, San Francisco. It was operated by the Russian Ministry of Foreign Affairs. The building of the former consulate remains government property of Russia.

History
The first Russian consul in San Francisco was Peter Kostromitinov. He was an agent of the Russian-American Company and the manager at Fort Ross. He took his post in 1852. The first consulate of the Soviet Union in San Francisco opened in 1933. On the outbreak of war in Europe, the consulate quietly funded isolationist groups committed to keeping America out the war, and attempting to block aid to Britain. These included the American Peace Committee, an activist group organized by the Communist Party, USA(CPUSA). After US entry into World War II U.S.-Soviet Alliance Jacob M. Lomakin was Consul General (1942-1944). He was active in the Lend-Lease program to aid Britain, and at meetings for raising funds to aid the Red Army. These last meetings were funded by a coalition anti-fascist organizations, among them the non-partisan International Committee of the Red Cross, and the CPUSA-led  American-Russian Institute and Russian War Relief. Together with a scattering of progressive cultural figures, military, and governmental officials of the United States, Lomakin advocated the opening of the Second Front, to relieve military pressure on the Soviet Union. The building at 2563 Divisadero Street held the consulate until 1948, when with the onset of the Cold War the Government of the USSR closed its consulates in New York and San Francisco, meaning the reciprocal closing of the US consulates in Leningrad and Vladivostok. Consular relations between the USSR and the US were restored only after 24 years in 1972 and the Consulate of the USSR was at 24 California Street and the James Flood Building. On June 23, 1973, it moved into its current location.

In 2011 the consulate bought new headstones, for a total of $20,000, for Russian sailors who died fighting a fire in San Francisco in 1863. The graves were installed on Mare Island in Vallejo, California. The city government protested the plan, saying that it goes against historical preservation.

In December 2016, four Russian diplomats posted to the consulate, including a chef were declared persona non grata due to alleged espionage, in retaliation for Russian interference in the United States presidential election.

On 31 August 2017, the State Department ordered the post closed by September 2, 2017. Before the consulate was closed, smoke was seen billowing out of the building, suggesting sensitive materials were being destroyed.

Espionage
Members of the United States intelligence community, including Kathleen Puckett, considered the Russian consulate a major hub of Russian espionage operations, tasked with gaining information about developments from Silicon Valley. In 1984, a United States government report indicated that there may have been approximately 50 Soviet spies operating out of the San Francisco Consulate, primarily targeting Silicon Valley.

In 1987, Ivan N. Miroshkin of the Soviet Ministry of Foreign Affairs, reported that the consulate had been bugged.

Russian diplomats based out of the consulate were reportedly mapping where underground nodes connected to the national fiber-optic communication network.

A network of antennas and other electronic communication equipment is located on the roof of the consulate building and is allegedly used to transmit information to submarines or trawlers located off the Pacific coast in international waters.

References

External links

 Consulate-General of Russia in San Francisco

1933 establishments in California
2017 disestablishments in California
San Francisco
Russia
Defunct diplomatic missions in the United States
Soviet Union–United States relations
Russia–United States relations